Pardaleodes sator, the scarce pathfinder skipper, is a butterfly in the family Hesperiidae. It is found in Sierra Leone, Guinea, Liberia, Ivory Coast, Ghana, Togo, Nigeria, Cameroon, Gabon, the Republic of the Congo, the Central African Republic, Angola, the Democratic Republic of the Congo, Sudan, Uganda, Kenya and Tanzania. The habitat consists of forests.

The larvae feed on Oplismenus hirtellus.

Subspecies
Pardaleodes sator sator (Sierra Leone, Guinea, Liberia, Ivory Coast, Ghana, Togo, Nigeria, western Cameroon)
Pardaleodes sator pusiella Mabille, 1877 (Cameroon: except the west, Gabon, Congo, Central African Republic, Angola, Democratic Republic of the Congo, southern Sudan, Uganda, western Kenya, western Tanzania)

References

Butterflies described in 1852
Erionotini